Club Baloncesto Villa de Valdemoro is a  Basketball team based in Valdemoro, Community of Madrid. Today, he senior team doesn't play any competition.

Season by season

External links
Official website

Basketball teams in the Community of Madrid
Former Liga EBA teams